Tom Solesbury (born 23 September 1980 in Farnborough) is a British rower. He competed in the coxless pairs at the 2008 Summer Olympics and the quadruple sculls at the 2012 Summer Olympics.

References

External links 
 

1980 births
Living people
English male rowers
People from Farnborough, Hampshire
Rowers at the 2008 Summer Olympics
Rowers at the 2012 Summer Olympics
Olympic rowers of Great Britain
Members of Leander Club
Alumni of the University of Warwick
Alumni of Saïd Business School
World Rowing Championships medalists for Great Britain